, also known as , was a shamaness-queen of Yamatai-koku in . Early Chinese dynastic histories chronicle tributary relations between Queen Himiko and the Cao Wei Kingdom (220–265) and record that the Yayoi period people chose her as ruler following decades of warfare among the kings of Wa. Early Japanese histories do not mention Himiko, but historians associate her with legendary figures such as Empress Consort Jingū, who is said to have served as regent from 201 to 269.

Scholarly debates over the identity of Himiko and the location of her domain, Yamatai, have raged since the late Edo period, with opinions divided between northern Kyūshū or traditional Yamato Province in present-day Kinki. The "Yamatai controversy", writes Keiji Imamura, is "the greatest debate over the ancient history of Japan." A prevailing view among scholars is that she may be buried at Hashihaka Kofun in Nara Prefecture.

Historical references
The shaman Queen Himiko is recorded in various ancient histories, dating back to 3rd-century China, 8th-century Japan, and 12th-century Korea.

Chinese sources
This section is the first description of Himiko (Pimiko) and Yamatai:

This early history describes how Himiko came to the throne:

The "Records of Wei" also records envoys travelling between the Wa and Wei courts. Himiko's emissaries first visited the court of Wei emperor Cao Rui in 238, and he replied:

The governor dispatched "Chang Chêng, acting Secretary of the Border Guard" with a "proclamation advising reconciliation", and subsequently:

Two other Chinese dynastic histories mentioned Himiko. While both clearly incorporated the  reports, they made some changes, such as specifying the "some seventy or eighty years" of Wa wars occurred between 146 and 189, during the reigns of Han Emperors Huan and Ling. The  Book of Later Han says "the King of Great Wa resides in the country of Yamadai", rather than the Queen:

The 636 Book of Sui changes the number of Himiko's male attendants:

Japanese sources
Neither of the two oldest Japanese histories – the   nor   – mentions Queen Himiko. The circumstances under which these books were written is a matter of unending debate, and even if Himiko were known to the authors, they may have purposefully decided not to include her. However, they include three imperial-family shamans identified with her: Yamatototohimomosohime-no-Mikoto (ja), the aunt of Emperor Sujin (legendary 10th Japanese emperor, reigned 97–30 BC) and daughter of Emperor Kōrei; Yamatohime-no-mikoto, the daughter of Emperor Suinin (legendary 11th, reigned 29 BC–70 AD); and Empress Jingū (reigned  AD), the wife of Emperor Chūai (legendary 14th emperor, reigned 192–200 AD). These dates, however, are not historically verified.

In 239, "the queen [] of Wa" sent envoys to Wei; in 240, they returned "charged with an Imperial rescript and a seal and ribbon;" and in 243, "the ruler [ "king"] of Wa again sent high officers as envoys with tribute". It is revealing that the  editors chose to omit the  particulars about Himiko.

, the shaman aunt of Emperor Sujin, supposedly committed suicide after learning her husband was a trickster snake-god. The  does not mention her, but the  describes her as "the Emperor's aunt by the father's side, a shrewd and intelligent person, who could foresee the future". After a series of national calamities, the Emperor "assembled the 80 myriads of Deities" and inquired by divination. Yamato-totohi-momoso was inspired by Ōmononushi-nushi ("Great Deity of All Deities and Spirits"), to say: "Why is the Emperor grieved at the disordered state of the country? If he duly did us reverent worship it would assuredly become pacified of itself." The Emperor inquired, saying: "What God is it that thus instructs me?" The answer was: "I am the God who dwells within the borders of the land of Yamato, and my name is Oho-mono-nushi no Kami." While imperial worship of this god (from Mount Miwa) was "without effect", Yamato-totohi-momoso later married him.

The  Kofun in Sakurai, Nara is associated with this legend.

, the daughter of Emperor Suinin, supposedly founded the Ise Shrine to the sun-goddess Amaterasu. The  records her as the fourth of Suinin's five children, "Her Augustness Yamato-hime, (was the high-priestess of the temple of the Great Deity of Ise)". The  likewise records "Yamato-hime no Mikoto" and provides more details. The Emperor assigned Yamato-hime to find a permanent location for Amaterasu's shrine, and after wandering for years, the sun-goddess instructed her to build it at Ise "where she first descended from Heaven".

Empress Consort Jingū (or ) supposedly served as regent after the death of her husband Emperor Chūai until the accession of her son Emperor Ōjin (legendary 15th emperor). The  and  have similar accounts. Emperor Chūai wanted to invade Kumaso, and while he was consulting with his ministers, Jingū conveyed a shamanistic message that he should invade Silla instead. Compare these:

The Emperor thought the gods were lying, said he had only seen ocean to the West, and then died, either immediately or after invading Kumaso. Jingū allegedly discovered she was pregnant, personally planned and led a successful conquest of Silla, gave birth to the future emperor, and returned to rule Yamato. The  adds that since Jingū wanted to learn which gods had cursed Chūai, she constructed a shamanic "palace of worship", "discharged in person the office of priest", and heard the gods reveal themselves as coming from Ise (Amaterasu) and Mukatsu (an unnamed Korean divinity).

Korean sources

Interpretations
Researchers have struggled to reconcile Himiko/Pimiko between Chinese and Japanese historical sources. While the  described her as an important ruler in 3rd-century Japan, early Japanese historians purposely avoided naming Himiko, even when the  quoted the  about envoys from Wa.

Name

However, these contemporary readings differ considerably from how 'Himiko' was pronounced in the 3rd century, both by speakers of the unknown Wa-language and by Chinese scribes who transcribed it. While transliteration into Chinese characters of foreign words is complex, the choice of these three particular characters is puzzling, with literal meanings  "low; inferior; humble",  "fill, cover; full; whole, complete", and  "breathe out; exhale; cry out; call".

In terms of historical Chinese phonology, the modern  is simpler than its presumed 3rd-century late Old Chinese or early Middle Chinese pronunciation. Compare the following reconstructions of the name in Archaic Chinese or Middle Chinese (Bernhard Karlgren, Li Fanggui, and William H. Baxter), Early Middle Chinese (Edwin G. Pulleyblank), and, historically closest, Late Han Chinese (Axel Schuessler).
 (Karlgren)
 (Li)
 (Baxter)
 (Schuessler)

In terms of Japanese phonology (which historically did not have the consonant /h/ and whose modern /h/ evolves from historical /p/), the accepted modern reading of 'Himiko' would regularly correspond to Old Japanese . However, Roy Andrew Miller says  is a lexicographic error deriving from the  transcriptions.

Tsunoda notes that "Pimiko is from an archaic Japanese title, meaning 'princess'"; that is,  with the female name suffix  ("child"), viz. the uncommon given name Himeko.

Identity and historicity
Identifying Himiko/Pimiko of Wa is straightforward within the history of China, but problematic within the history of Japan. The 3rd-century Chinese  ("Records of Wei") provides details about shaman Queen Himiko and her communications with Emperors Cao Rui and Cao Fang.

None of these three legendary Japanese royal shamans adequately corresponds with the Chinese chronology and description of Himiko. Assuming the  account that Himiko died around 248, if one accepts the dubious Japanese traditional dating, then she was closer to the 3rd-century AD Empress Jingū than to the 1st-century BC Yamato-hime-no-mikoto and Yamato-toto-hi-momo-so-hime. On the other hand, if one accepts the postdating adjustments prior to the 4th century, then Himiko was closer to these Yamato-named shamans. Neither the  nor the  mentions Himiko or any of the salient topics that she was unmarried, was chosen as ruler by the people, had a younger brother who helped rule (unless this refers to Jingū's son), or had numerous (figuratively "1,000") female attendants.

William Wayne Farris reviews the history of scholarly debates over Himiko and her domain Yamatai. The Confucianist Arai accepted the Chinese history as more reliable, and first equated Himiko with Jingū and Yamatai with Yamato. The  scholar Motoori accepted the traditional Japanese myth-history as more reliable, and dismissed its  quotations as later accretions. He hypothesized that a king from Kumaso sent emissaries who masqueraded as Jingū's officials to the Wei court, thus leading Wei to mistake them for representatives of Himiko. Farris states that "Motoori's usurpation hypothesis carried great weight for the next century."

Nakoku is said to have existed from the 1st century to the early 3rd century, and seems to have been independent or even a rival of the current Imperial House of Japan, supposedly in Yamato, Honshū.

After the Meiji Restoration in 1868, Japanese historians adopted European historical scholarship, especially the source-based methodology of Leopold von Ranke. Naka Michiyo believed the  chronology was inaccurate prior to the 4th century, and thus  "Jingū became a fourth-century queen whose reign could not possibly have coincided with Himiko's." The sinologist Shiratori Kurakichi proposed the  compilers were tempted to associate Jingū with the religious powers of Himiko. Naitō Torajirō argued that Himiko was the high priestess of the Ise shrine Yamato-hime-no-mikoto and that Wa armies obtained control of southern Korea:

Some later Japanese historians reframed Himiko in terms of Marxist historiography. Masaaki Ueda argued that "Himiko's was a despotic state with a generalized slave system" , while Mitsusada Inoue idealized Yamatai as a "balance of small states" with communal property and popular political expression. Following the late 1960s "Yamatai boom", when numerous Japanese historians, linguists, and archeologists published reevaluations of Himiko and Yamatai, the debate was joined by Japanese nationalists, mystery writers, and amateur scholars.

Several archeological excavations of Yayoi and Kofun sites in kinki region, have revealed Chinese-style bronze mirrors, called . Many scholars who support the Kinki theory associate these  with the "one hundred bronze mirrors" that the  records Emperor Cao Rui presented to Queen Himiko, while other scholars oppose it. The Hashihaka Kofun in Sakurai, Nara was given a recent boost by radio-carbon dating circa 240–60. The early Chinese records of Himiko/Pimiko and her Yamatai polity remain something of a Rorschach test. To different interpreters, this early Japanese shaman queen can appear as evidence of communalism (Marxists), Jōmon priestess rulers (Feminist history), the Japanese conquest of Korea, the Mongolian conquest of Japan (Namio Egami's "horserider theory" (ja)), the imperial system originating with tandem rule by a female shaman and male monarch, the "patriarchal revolution" replacing female deities and priestesses with male counterparts, or a shamanic advisor to the federation of Wa chieftains who "must have looked like a ruling queen to Chinese envoys".

Modern depictions 

Depictions of Himiko in Japanese popular media take one of three archetypes: Himiko as a wise, old ruler; Himiko the cute and energetic shaman; or Himiko as a seductive sorceress. She is associated with several ritual objects including the  – two large bronze bells ritually used at the end of the Yayoi period – as well as the  branch and Chinese bronze mirrors. As such, Himiko is sometimes negatively associated with black magic or demons. Ruling in the transitional period between the Yayoi and Kofun eras, depictions of Himiko often display her wearing clothing originating from a variety of time periods, often embodied masculine elements. A queen during the late Yayoi, Himiko likely wore a one-piece, wide-sleeved  under a vest and sash. She is also often depicted wearing  beads and a diadem. However, no one can be certain what Himiko wore.

Himiko is also depicted as a wicked sorceress or tyrant. Such depictions usually present Himiko as a seductress in sexually revealing clothing, with large breasts, depicted in compromising positions, seeming to assert that Himiko's power arose from nefarious sexual appeal. One such depiction appears in the online role-playing game Atlantica Online, in which Himiko appears a steampunk mercenary in revealing costume. These depictions cater largely to the otaku fan base.

Town mascots 
Himiko's legend has been used to market a variety of objects. Various small towns seek to use Himiko as their mascot, claiming their town as her birthplace, although the archaeological evidence supports regions in the Nara basin as her capital. Yoshinogari City and Sakurai City in Nara prefecture both employ images of Himiko to attract tourists, using images such as chibi Himiko-chan welcoming travelers to the region.

Manga and graphic novels 
Himiko has appeared in various manga issues and comics.
 Lord (manga)
 The first volume of Osamu Tezuka's Phoenix
 The cover of Fujiwara Kamui's 
 Gakken's manga  by Ōishi Manabu, Takano Kazuhiro, and Himekawa Akira
 Afterschool Charisma by Kumiko Suekane
 Dark Horse Comics' 2014 Tomb Raider comic series set after the events of the game, Himiko returns to the plot for a few issues

Anime and video games 
Himiko is a character who appears occasionally in anime and video games.

 Himiko appears in the anime Steel Jeeg, a Go Nagai series from the 1970s.
 The anime series and PlayStation game Legend of Himiko features time travel between ancient Yamatai and modern Japan, with Himiko eventually helping to save Yamatai.
 Himiko is one of the supporting characters in the video game , a game which draws on many Japanese folktales and myths to tell the story of the white wolf Amaterasu and her quest to free Japan from darkness. 
 Himiko is in the 2013 Tomb Raider reboot as a plot device.
 Himiko appears in the mobile game Fate/Grand Order as a limited 5-Star Ruler-class Servant. She debuted during the Super Ancient Shinsengumi History GUDAGUDA Yamatai-koku 2020 event.
 In the Heroes & Legends mode of Sid Meier's Civilization VI, Himiko is a recruitable Hero.
 In Warriors Orochi 2, her character befriends Da Ji. She also appears in Musou Orochi Z, Warriors Orochi 3, and Warriors Orochi 4.
 In the music/rhythm game Beatmania IIDX 16: Empress, the "One More Extra Stage" final boss song of the Empress Place event is named after Himiko, in which an interpretation of her likeness is also displayed.
 In Shin Megami Tensei: Persona 4, she is Rise Kujikawa's persona.
 In Might & Magic Heroes VI, Himiko is a corrupt Naga priestess.

Cinema 
 In the 2018 Tomb Raider film directed by Roar Uthaug (which was adapted from the 2013 video game of the same name), Himiko is at the heart of the plot.
 Japanese film director Masahiro Shinoda directed a film about Himiko, called Himiko.

Sales 
Sanrio has created a Himiko-inspired keychain.

Researcher Laura Miller recounts eating a dish named for Himiko at Shinobuan Cafe in Moriyama City, where the name apparently gave rise to the popularity of the dish.

Himiko contests 
Queen Himiko contests take place in small towns offering cash prizes to women over the age of eighteen on the basis of charm and appearance. One of the earliest of these contests began in Yamatokoriyama in Nara. One such contest, Himikon, takes place in Moriyama City. Asakura in Kyushu also holds a Himiko contest during its annual Yamataikoku Festival of Flowers.

Namesake 
The proper name Himiko has been diversely applied, not only in Japanese society but also in other realms such as astronomy.  is a train on the Amagi Railway Amagi Line and a water bus of Tokyo Cruise Ship designed by Leiji Matsumoto.

The name Himiko was given to a Lyman-alpha blob (a massive concentration of hydrogen gas believed to be a protogalaxy) that was discovered in 2009. Massing close to 40 billion suns and located 12.9 billion light years from Earth in the constellation Cetus, as of 2014 it is the largest and most distant known example of its kind.

The one million dollar filly  of 2015 American Triple Crown winner American Pharoah and Untouched Talent (mother of 2012 Kentucky Derby second Bodemeister) was named Himiko.

See also 

 Empress Jingu
 List of female castellans in Japan

Explanatory notes

References

Citations

General and cited references 
 
 
 
 
 
 
 
 
 .

External links
 Himiko, Britannica Online Encyclopedia
 Miller, Laura. 2014. "Rebranding Himiko, the Shaman Queen of Ancient History". In Mechademia, An Annual Forum for ANime, Manga and the Fan Arts: Issue #9: Origins. Minneapoolis, MN: University of Minnesota Press, 179-198.
 Miller, Laura. 2018. "Searching for Charisma Queen Himiko." In Diva Nation: Female Icons from Japanese Cultural History, edited by Laura Miller and Rebecca Copeland, 51-79. Berkeley: University of California Press.
 Nara tomb discovery may stir debate over site of Queen Himiko's realm, The Japan Times, March 29, 2000
 Japan Heads of State, Worldwide Guide to Women in Leadership
 The Earliest Kofuns in the Southeastern Part of the Nara Basin, Noboru Ogata
 Model of Himiko's Palace, Osaka Prefectural Museum of Yayoi Culture 
 Yomiuri Shimbun: "Himikio -- 90% name recognition amongst primary school students in Japan", 2008.

2nd-century women rulers
248 deaths
Ancient Japanese priestesses
Aristocracy of ancient Japan
Queens regnant in Asia
People of Yayoi-period Japan
3rd-century women rulers
175 births
Shamanism in Japan
Japanese women in warfare
People whose existence is disputed
Women rulers in Japan
Women in ancient warfare
Yamatai
Wajinden